Alejandro Andrade (born 2 August 1964) is a former Venezuelan military officer and politician. A 1987 graduate of the Military Academy of Venezuela, he was appointed as minister of finance and president of Banfoandes under the administration of the then president, Hugo Chávez. Andrade, a member of Venezuela's boliburguesía, he received a ten-year sentence inn the USA for money laundering in 2018.

Early life
Andrade was born in the parish of Coche, located southwest of Caracas. In 1964, he graduated from the Venezuelan Academy of Military Sciences and participated in the 1992 coup d'état attempts alongside then Lieutenant Colonel Hugo Chávez. During Chávez's 1998 presidential campaign, Andrade acted as his personal bodyguard and secretary. After being elected president, Chávez appointed Andrade to be his private secretary. He was involved in numerous bureaucratic positions, all related to the finance and economical sectors since then until his relocation to the United States.

In the United States, Andrade resided in a  home on an estate in Wellington, Florida, his largest of several properties.

Imprisonment
In December 2017, Andrade pleaded guilty to receiving more than a billion dollars from Raúl Gorrín, president of Globovisión channel, and others in exchange for using his position as minister of finance to adjudicate transactions in foreign exchange. On 19 February 2019, he was sentenced to ten years in prison for various money laundering crimes, the biggest being a $2.4 billion money scheme. Andrade surrendered to authorities in the US on 25 February 2019.

References

1964 births
Bolivarian Military University of Venezuela alumni
Bank presidents and chief executive officers
United Socialist Party of Venezuela politicians
Government ministers of Venezuela
Living people
Venezuelan people imprisoned abroad
Bodyguards
People of the 1992 Venezuelan coup d'état attempts
Venezuelan politicians convicted of corruption
Members of the Venezuelan Constituent Assembly of 1999